Black River Township is one of thirteen townships in Harnett County, North Carolina, United States. The township had a population of 8,085 according to the 2000 census. It is a part of the Dunn Micropolitan Area, which is also a part of the greater Raleigh–Durham–Cary Combined Statistical Area (CSA) as defined by the United States Census Bureau.

Geographically, Black River Township occupies  in northern Harnett County. The only incorporated municipality within Black River Township is Angier. The township's northern border is with Wake County to the northwest and Johnston County to the northeast.

Watersheds
Neills Creek, a tributary to the Cape Fear River, flows through the west side of Black River township. The Black River rises and flows through the eastern side.

Townships in Harnett County, North Carolina
Townships in North Carolina